The Siel DK70 is a synthesizer produced in 1986 by Siel.

Description
It is very similar to a Korg Poly-800, in that it operates like an analog synth, but its oscillators, LFO and envelope generators are all digital.  Like the Poly-800, the DK-70 has eight oscillators/voices, but all the voices are mixed together through a single "monophonic" analog lowpass filter which was shared for all voices. Like a monophonic synthesizer, the filter was switchable between single or multiple modes. In single mode, the first key pressed triggers the filter envelope, and unless all keys are released, the filter does not re-trigger. In multi mode, each key pressed in turn triggers the filter envelope, even if other keys are still pressed down.

The oscillators are called "DCOs", and the envelope generated called a DEG (for Digital Envelope Generator).  Digital components were much cheaper at the time and this allowed the DK70 to approximate the sound of an analog synth, but have 8 note polyphony without being cost prohibitive to the average user.

An unusual feature of the DK70 is that, while it appears to have the form factor of a standard synth, it has guitar strap pegs and can be used as a keytar.  (The Poly-800 also had this feature.) An accessory called the "Stage Set" can be attached to the left side to provide a grip (similar to that of the SH-101), where the player may manipulate a ribbon-style pitch bender, as well as have access to buttons that change patches, change octaves and engage the LFO
modulation.

It stores 50 patches, 10 of which are user assignable.  A cartridge port accepted a cartridge which could store an additional 50 patches.  All programming is done via pushbuttons, somewhat limiting its "tweakability" for live performances.

It also has an onboard two-track sequencer, which can be programmed by
setting the tempo and recording a performance (unlike a step sequencer, where notes were entered in sequential order and played back at fixed durations).  The performance would then loop when played back.

The synth engine was also available as a keyboardless, rack-mount or table top version called the Expander-80, similar to the Korg EX-800.
Released in Brazil as Giannini GS 7010 polyphonic synthesizer

External links 
 Siel DK70 at sonicstate.com

Keytars